The  is a DC electric multiple unit (EMU) train type operated by East Japan Railway Company (JR East) in Japan since October 2009 on Narita Express limited express services to and from Narita International Airport.

Design
The design of the trains was overseen by industrial designer Kenji Ekuan. Retracting gangway connections on the end cars allow two sets to be coupled together to form 12-car formations. Electrical and safety equipment is duplicated, as on the E233 series commuter trains, to improve safety and reliability. Active suspension on end cars and yaw dampers between all cars for improved ride comfort. The MoHa E259-500 car is equipped with two pantographs, but one is for emergency use.

Unlike the 253 series, the E259 series trains are not equipped with Automatic Train Control (ATC).

Operations

One set, Ne002, is assigned to these services, and carries a logo sticker on the front and sides.

Formation
The fleet consists of 22 six-car sets, consisting of four motored (M) cars and two trailer (T) cars, as shown below, with car 1 at the Tokyo end.

The "Tsc" cars are green (first class) cars. Cars 3 and 5 are equipped with PS33D single-arm pantographs (two on car 5).

Bogies
The DT77 (motored) and TR262 (trailer) bolsterless bogies are developed from the DT71 and TR255 bogies used on the E233 series EMUs. The end bogies of the Tc driving cars are designated TR262, and the inner bogies of the Tc driving cars are designated TR262A. All the bogies use tread brakes, and the trailer bogies additionally use disc brakes. Wheel diameter is 860 mm, and the distance between wheel centres is 2,100 mm.

Interior accommodation
The passenger compartment floor construction has been improved for reduced interior noise, and the height difference between coach and platform has been reduced by 50 mm compared with the earlier 253 series trains for ease of access. Luggage storage areas feature lockable straps for security, and security cameras are installed in vestibule and luggage areas. Luggage space is also provided beneath the seats. Electric power outlets are provided at each seat.

Four ceiling-mounted passenger information display units are provided in each car. These feature two 17-inch screens on each side, displaying information in four languages (Japanese, English, Korean, and Chinese).

Ordinary class

Ordinary-class cars have 2+2 abreast seating with forward-facing rotating/reclining seats.

Green class

Green (first class) cars have leather-covered forward-facing rotating/reclining seats also arranged in 2+2 configuration.

History

The first two sets, Ne001 and Ne002, were delivered to Kamakura Depot from Tokyu Car Corporation's Yokohama factory on 23 April 2009, with test running on the Sōbu Main Line commencing the same day.

Nine E259 series sets entered revenue service on Narita Express services from 1 October 2009, with 10 out of 26 return workings daily operated by E259s.  By June 2010, they had completely replaced the 253 series EMUs formerly used on Narita Express services.

Build details
The manufacturers and delivery dates for the fleet are as shown below.

See also
 Keisei AE series (2009), train operated by rival company Keisei
 NS Koploper, trains featuring a similar walk-through design

References

External links

 JR East　E259 series description 
 JR East E259 series (Japan Railfan Magazine Online) 

Electric multiple units of Japan
East Japan Railway Company
Train-related introductions in 2009
Kinki Sharyo multiple units
1500 V DC multiple units of Japan
Tokyu Car multiple units